Adolf Tonn (13 November 1929 – 2 October 2013) was an Austrian bobsledder. He competed in the two-man and the four-man events at the 1956 Winter Olympics.

References

External links
 

1929 births
2013 deaths
Austrian male bobsledders
Olympic bobsledders of Austria
Bobsledders at the 1956 Winter Olympics